Aleks may refer to:
 Aleks (given name)
 ALEKS, online tutoring and assessment program
 Aleks (footballer) (born 1991), Brazilian football goalkeeper

See also
 
 
 Alex (disambiguation)
 Alexander (disambiguation)
 Aleksa (disambiguation)
 Alek (disambiguation)